The Tingamarra Fauna is associated with the early Eocene Murgon fossil site, and contains the earliest known non-flying eutherian, passerine, trionychidae turtles, mekosuchine crocodiles along with frogs, lungfish and teleost fish in Australia. The Murgon fossil site is located near Kingaroy in south-east Queensland (26° 14' S, 151° 57' E).

Geology
Material that represents the fossil component is the MP1 horizon in a sequence of lacustrine clays from Boat Mountain. The geological formation of the site is not known for certain, but may be associated with the Oakdale Sandstone formation. The area was a swamp or shallow lake at the time of deposition, though the habitat has not been determined. Potassium-argon dating of illites has given a date of about 54.6 million years, which is before Australia's separation from Antarctica and South America

References

Further reading 
 

Eocene paleontological sites
Cenozoic paleontological sites of Australia
Prehistoric fauna by locality
Paleontology in Queensland